Divine Madness is a 1980 American concert film directed by Michael Ritchie, and featuring Bette Midler and the Harlettes during her 1979 concerts at Pasadena Civic Auditorium in Pasadena, California. The 94-minute film features Midler's stand-up comedy routines, as well as 16 songs, including "Big Noise from Winnetka", "Paradise", "Shiver Me Timbers", "Fire Down Below", "Stay With Me", "My Mother's Eyes", "Chapel of Love" / "Boogie Woogie Bugle Boy", "Do You Want to Dance", "You Can't Always Get What You Want" / "I Shall Be Released", "E Street Shuffle" / "Summer (The First Time)" / "Leader of the Pack", and "The Rose".

Richie filmed four of Midler's concerts on the tour, and cut them together to look like one. Divine Madness was released in 1980 to relative critical success. The tracks "Shiver Me Timbers" and "Rainbow Sleeve" were edited out of the home video version. Divine Madness has been re-released on DVD, but, as yet, only in the US.

Music
For further info see Divine Madness (Bette Midler album)

External links

 

1980 films
American documentary films
Concert films
Warner Bros. films
Films directed by Michael Ritchie
The Ladd Company films
1980s English-language films
1980s American films